Onchidiopsis glacialis is a species of small sea snail with a transparent internal shell, a marine gastropod mollusk in the family Velutinidae. Because the shell is mostly internal, the snail resembles a sea slug in general appearance.

Distribution
The distribution of Onchidiopsis glacialis includes European waters.

Description 
The maximum recorded (shell?) length is 18 mm.

Habitat 
The minimum recorded depth for this species is 4 m; maximum recorded depth is 300 m.

References

Velutinidae
Taxa named by Michael Sars
Gastropods described in 1851